Montcorbon is a former commune in the Loiret department in north-central France. On 1 January 2016, it was merged into the new commune of Douchy-Montcorbon.

See also
 Communes of the Loiret department

References

Former communes of Loiret